Colmar-Berg railway station is a railway station serving Colmar-Berg, in central Luxembourg.  It is operated by Chemins de Fer Luxembourgeois, the state-owned railway company.

The station is situated on Line 10, which connects Luxembourg City to the centre and north of the country.

External links
 Official CFL page on Colmar-Berg station
 Rail.lu page on Colmar-Berg station

Railway station
Railway stations in Luxembourg
Railway stations on CFL Line 10